BBC Look North is a name used by the BBC for its regional news programmes in three regions in the North of England:

BBC Look North for the BBC North East and Cumbria region 
BBC Look North for the BBC Yorkshire region
BBC Look North for the BBC Yorkshire and Lincolnshire region

Prior to 1980, BBC North West Tonight for the BBC North West region, was also called BBC Look North.

BBC